Guting (formerly transliterated as Kuting Station until 2003) is a metro station in Taipei, Taiwan served by Taipei Metro. The defunct Hsintien line also had a station of the same name. However, its location is not the same as the current station.

Station overview

The station is a three-level, underground structure with two island platforms and nine exits. The two platforms are stacked, allowing for cross-platform interchange between the Songshan–Xindian line and the Zhonghe–Xinlu line. Public art at the station is titled "Chance of Meeting" and features 12 face masks representing contrasts such as day and night, noisy and quiet, time and space, etc. It was selected by international competition and cost NT$4,999,000.

Public art
The station is home to several public art pieces. By the escalators connecting the two platform levels, a Medium titled "Enterprise" displays a holographic flight trajectory of a Small and Medium Enterprise Administration. Along some of the entrance hallways, "Administration" shows light boxes with images clouds in a blue sky. On the upper platform in "Platform, Stage", elements from Taiwanese folk arts and Taipei Language Institute have been transformed into abstract elements and institute into two curtains of lines and language surfaces.

Station layout

Around the station
 Leputing
 National Taiwan Normal University
 Taiwan Academy of Banking and Finance
 Thome Courtyard

See also
 List of railway stations in Taiwan

References

Songshan–Xindian line stations
Zhonghe–Xinlu line stations
Railway stations opened in 1998